Bourne is a ghost town in Baker County, Oregon, United States about  north of Sumpter in the Blue Mountains. It lies on Cracker Creek and is within the Wallowa–Whitman National Forest. Platted in 1902, the former gold mining boomtown is considered a ghost town today.

Originally named "Cracker City", Bourne is named after Senator Jonathan Bourne, Jr., who was interested in Eastern Oregon mines for a time. Bourne post office was established in 1895 and closed in 1927.

In 1910 Bourne town was listed as having a population of 77.

See also
List of ghost towns in Oregon

References

External links
Historic images of Bourne from the Baker County Library
Images of Bourne from ghosttowngallery.com

Former populated places in Baker County, Oregon
Ghost towns in Oregon
Populated places established in 1902
1902 establishments in Oregon
Unincorporated communities in Oregon